St. John's Church, Worksop is the parish church of Worksop, Nottinghamshire, England.

History

The church was built between 1867 and 1868 by the architect Robert Clarke and his son Robert Charles Clarke. In September 2019 the Church celebrated its 150th anniversary.

Incumbents

1867 - 1872 Revd Charles Bury
1872 - 1909 Revd George Dobree
1909 - 1930 Revd John Henry Bligh
1930 - 1937 Revd Edwin Arthur Green
1937 - 1946 Revd. Cuthbert Rowland James Hayes
1947 - 1955 Revd John Robert Joughin Kerruish
1955 - 1962 Revd Jack Richard Hassett
1962 - c1975 Revd Canon Robert Purdon Neill
c1975 - c1985 Revd Albert Brown
c1985 - 1990 Revd Bruce Hunt
c1991- 2000 Revd Glynn Jones
2001- 2011 Revd Neil Hogg
2013 -         Revd Tim Stanford

Organ

The church has an organ by Brindley & Foster dating from 1869. The specification of the organ can be found on the National Pipe Organ Register

See also
Listed buildings in Worksop

References

Church of England church buildings in Nottinghamshire
Grade II listed churches in Nottinghamshire
Worksop